Zdravko Stoyanov Zdravkov (born 4 October 1970 in Sofia) is a former Bulgarian football goalkeeper. He ended his career at the end of 2006–07 season.

Club career
On the club level, Zdravkov has played for Levski Sofia (1989–1995), Istanbulspor (1997–1999 and 2000–2002), Adanaspor (1999–2000), Cherno More (2002–2003), Litex Lovech (2003–2004) and Çaykur Rizespor (2004–2007).

December 2002 until January 2003, Zdravkov spent a trial period with Arsenal F.C., but did not eventually sign with the then-reigning FA Premier League champions.

International career
For Bulgaria, Zdravkov has been capped 70 times. He made his debut on 24 April 1996, against Slovakia in Trnava. He was the starting goalkeeper for his country at the Euro 1996, 1998 World Cup and Euro 2004, succeeding Borislav Mihaylov as the custodian of the Bulgarian team.

Halfway through the France World Cup in 1998, with Bulgaria having played two games (0–0 against Paraguay and a 0–1 loss to Nigeria), Zdravkov was ranked as the 2nd best goalkeeper in form. Although he went on to concede 6 goals in Bulgaria's loss to Spain in the next game, Zdravkov was an exceptional performer at the World Cup.

Six years later, at UEFA Euro 2004, Zdravkov's age began to show,  Bulgaria lost 0–5 to Sweden, 0–2 to Denmark and 1–2 to Italy, and this was to be Zdravkov's final tournament as national team goalkeeper.

Personal
Zdravkov participated in the third season of Survivor BG, in Panama, but was evacuated due to serious health problems. He is married to Irena and they have three sons - Ivan, Yoan and Pavel.

Honours

Club
Levski Sofia
 A Group (2): 1992–93, 1994–95
 Bulgarian Cup (2): 1990–91, 1991–92

Slavia Sofia
 A Group: 1995–96
 Bulgarian Cup: 1995–96

Litex Lovech
 Bulgarian Cup: 2003–04

References

External links 
 Profile at LevskiSofia.info
 

1970 births
Living people
Bulgarian footballers
Bulgaria international footballers
1998 FIFA World Cup players
Association football goalkeepers
Çaykur Rizespor footballers
İstanbulspor footballers
Adanaspor footballers
Expatriate footballers in Turkey
Bulgarian expatriate sportspeople in Turkey
PFC Levski Sofia players
PFC Litex Lovech players
PFC Slavia Sofia players
UEFA Euro 2004 players
UEFA Euro 1996 players
PFC Cherno More Varna players
Bulgarian expatriate footballers
First Professional Football League (Bulgaria) players
Süper Lig players
Expatriate football managers in China
Bulgarian football managers